Applied Engineering, headquartered in Carrollton, TX, was a leading third-party hardware vendor for the Apple II series of computers from the early 1980s until the mid-1990s.

History

In its day, Applied Engineering built a solid reputation among Apple II owners for their innovation, excellent build quality, and generous warranty support.  AE was quick to fill in gaps in the market for Apple II add-on boards and expansion options, often developing products for the Apple II line that neither Apple Computer nor other third-party vendors offered.

By the early 1990s, as Apple Computer, Inc., began to withdraw support for the Apple II series and focus on the Macintosh line, the market for Apple II hardware and software began to wane.  Many Apple II users began to migrate to other platforms, such as the Macintosh and IBM PC-compatibles.  In an attempt to capitalize on its well-known brand name among previous Apple II owners, Applied Engineering began to market products for the Macintosh and Commodore Amiga lines.  However, because of stiff competition in already active markets, and AE's late entries, Applied Engineering could not duplicate the success it had experienced with the Apple II. Around the same time, cost-cutting measures were implemented, such as shortening warranty periods, charging for technical support (via a 1-900 number) and a using inferior parts, turning off loyal and long-time customers. Eventually dwindling Apple II sales and a failure to shift into other markets caused Applied Engineering to go out of business by 1994.

Product offerings 

Some of Applied Engineering's best-known products for the Apple II included:
RamWorks — memory expansion card for the Apple IIe
TransWarp — CPU accelerator card for the Apple IIe and Apple IIGS
Vulcan — internal hard drive
PC Transporter — NEC V30 (Intel 8086-compatible) card that allowed Apple IIs to run MS-DOS programs
 
The TransWarp family of Apple II accelerators consisted of multiple products. The original TransWarp took over from the standard 1-MHz 6502 or 65C02 used in the Apple IIe with a 3.6 MHz version of the 65C02 (which could also be run at 1.8 MHz, selectable through hardware) and turned on and off completely through software. The TransWarp was later followed by a TransWarp II and TransWarp III, the latter of which was announced but never actually went into production. With Apple Computer's release of the Apple IIGS, Applied Engineering followed with a TransWarp GS, which provided an accelerated version of the 65C816 processor on which the IIGS was based.
 
Multi-function cards were a mainstay of AE's product offerings, of which the Serial Pro serial interface card was a typical example. Besides offering a standard RS-232 serial port, the card included a ProDOS-compatible real-time clock, thus combining two cards into one and freeing up an extra slot. When used with a dot-matrix printer, the Serial Pro offered several screen-dump print options, such as printing either of the two Apple II high-resolution pages alone, both in a single dump, or the first high-res page rotated or inverted.

Partial product list

For all Apple IIs except IIc/IIc Plus 
 
 Serial Pro — Apple II serial (RS-232) card
 Parallel Pro — Apple II parallel (IEEE 1284) card
 Buffer Pro — Buffer add-on for Parallel Pro
 Vulcan — Internal hard disk and controller
 Vulcan Gold — Internal hard disk
 PC Transporter — NEC V30 (Intel 8086-compatible) PC co-processor card
 Super Music Synthesizer — Apple II sound card
 Phasor — Apple II sound card
 TimeMaster H. O. and TimeMaster II H. O. — Apple II real-time clock card
 A/D + D/A Card — Analog/digital signal acquisition and industrial control card
 I/O 32 Card — 32-bit TTL/CMOS digital I/O card
 DataLink 1200/2400 — internal telephone modems
 FastMath — Math co-processor card
 Z-80 Plus — CP/M card

Apple II/II Plus Specific 
 AE 16K Card — Reduced-chip substitute for Apple's 16-kB Language Card
 ViewMaster 80 — Videx- and Videoterm-compatible 80-column card with lowercase and light pen support

Apple IIe 
 MemoryMaster — Early reduced-chip substitute for Apple's Extended 80-Column Card (80 columns + 64 kB RAM)
 MemoryMaster IIe — replacement 80-column card with 64kB—256kB
 RamWorks (a. k. a. RamWorks I, RamWorks Basic) — 80-column + memory expansion card with 256—1024 kB RAM
 RamWorks II — 80-column + memory expansion card with 1+ MB RAM
 RamWorks III — 80-column + memory expansion card with 1-3 MB RAM
 RamKeeper — Battery backup option for RamWorks series (to use RAM as non-volatile RAM disk)
 ColorLink  — Daughterboard RGB option for RamWorks series providing analog and IBM-compatible RGB output
 Digital Prism —  Daughterboard RGB option for RamWorks series providing IBM-compatible RGB output only
 TransWarp, TransWarp II — Apple II accelerator card

Apple IIc/IIc Plus 
 Z-RAM, Z-RAM Ultra, Z-RAM Ultra II, Z-RAM Ultra III — Memory expansion card
 RAM Express, RAM Express II — Memory expansion card (the RAM Express is an Apple-branded IIc RAM card with Applied Engineering stickers applied to cover the Apple logo)
 Z-80c — CP/M card

Apple IIGS 
 TransWarp GS — Apple IIGS accelerator card
 GS-RAM, GS-RAM Ultra, GS-RAM Plus — Apple IIGS memory expansion cards. The cards hold 1.5MB, 4MB, and 6MB respectively.
 RamKeeper — Battery backed RAM drive for the Apple IIGS
 Sonic Blaster — Apple IIGS sound card
 Audio Animator — Apple IIGS sound card with external audio mixer and MIDI I/O
 Conserver — Integrated disk drive organizer, surge protector, and cooling fan

Miscellaneous 
 AE 1.6-MB Drive — 1.6-MB, 3.5-inch floppy drive for IIGS (Apple's 3.5-inch drives for the Apple II stopped at 800 kB; GS/OS driver needed for 1.6-MB utilization)
 AE 1.44-MB Drive — 1.44-MB, 3.5-inch floppy drive for Commodore-Amiga 500, 2000 beat Commodore's own high density drive to market. Not compatible with the 1.76 mb Amiga Chinon high density floppy.
 AE 800-KB Drive — 800-KB, 3.5-inch floppy drive for IIe, IIc/IIc Plus, and IIGS
 TransWarp — 16 and 40 MHz accelerator boards for Macintosh SE

See also 
Apple II peripheral cards

External links 
 ReactiveMicro.com AE hardware supplier for TransWarp GS 32KB Cache Board, other TransWarp GS upgrades and GS RAM Plus PAL for ROM0/1 and ROM3 compatibility.
 16Sector.com Apple II Hardware supplier & Support site for AE Hardware / Software and other Apple II hardware.
 The Apple2OnlineStore Apple II+, IIe, IIc, IIc Plus & IIGS systems & accessories.
 Applied Engineering Repository Scans of company ads and catalogs, information about the company's history, and more.

Apple II family
Defunct engineering companies of the United States
Companies based in Carrollton, Texas
Defunct companies based in Texas
Defunct computer hardware companies